In mathematics, zero is an even number. In other words, its parity—the quality of an integer being even or odd—is even. This can be easily verified based on the definition of "even": it is an integer multiple of 2, specifically . As a result, zero shares all the properties that characterize even numbers: for example, 0 is neighbored on both sides by odd numbers, any decimal integer has the same parity as its last digit—so, since 10 is even, 0 will be even, and if  is even then  has the same parity as —and  always have the same parity.

Zero also fits into the patterns formed by other even numbers. Zero is the additive identity element  of the group of even integers, and it is the starting case from which other even natural numbers are recursively defined. Applications of this recursion from graph theory to computational geometry rely on zero being even. Not only is 0 divisible by 2, it is divisible by every power of 2, which is relevant to the binary numeral system used by computers. In this sense, 0 is the "most even" number of all.

Among the general public, the parity of zero can be a source of confusion. In reaction time experiments, most people are slower to identify 0 as even than 2, 4, 6, or 8. Some teachers —and some children in mathematics classes—think that zero is odd, or both even and odd, or neither. Researchers in mathematics education propose that these misconceptions can become learning opportunities. Studying equalities like  can address students' doubts about calling 0 a number and using it in arithmetic. Class discussions can lead students to appreciate the basic principles of mathematical reasoning, such as the importance of definitions. Evaluating the parity of this exceptional number is an early example of a pervasive theme in mathematics: the abstraction of a familiar concept to an unfamiliar setting.

Why zero is even
The standard definition of "even number" can be used to directly prove that zero is even. A number is called "even" if it is an integer multiple of 2. As an example, the reason that 10 is even is that it equals . In the same way, zero is an integer multiple of 2, namely  so zero is even.

It is also possible to explain why zero is even without referring to formal definitions. The following explanations make sense of the idea that zero is even in terms of fundamental number concepts. From this foundation, one can provide a rationale for the definition itself—and its applicability to zero.

Basic explanations

Given a set of objects, one uses a number to describe how many objects are in the set. Zero is the count of no objects; in more formal terms, it is the number of objects in the empty set. The concept of parity is used for making groups of two objects. If the objects in a set can be marked off into groups of two, with none left over, then the number of objects is even. If an object is left over, then the number of objects is odd. The empty set contains zero groups of two, and no object is left over from this grouping, so zero is even.

These ideas can be illustrated by drawing objects in pairs. It is difficult to depict zero groups of two, or to emphasize the nonexistence of a leftover object, so it helps to draw other groupings and to compare them with zero. For example, in the group of five objects, there are two pairs. More importantly, there is a leftover object, so 5 is odd. In the group of four objects, there is no leftover object, so 4 is even. In the group of just one object, there are no pairs, and there is a leftover object, so 1 is odd. In the group of zero objects, there is no leftover object, so 0 is even.

There is another concrete definition of evenness: if the objects in a set can be placed into two groups of equal size, then the number of objects is even. This definition is equivalent to the first one. Again, zero is even because the empty set can be divided into two groups of zero items each.

Numbers can also be visualized as points on a number line. When even and odd numbers are distinguished from each other, their pattern becomes obvious, especially if negative numbers are included:

The even and odd numbers alternate. Starting at any even number, counting up or down by twos reaches the other even numbers, and there is no reason to skip over zero.

With the introduction of multiplication, parity can be approached in a more formal way using arithmetic expressions. Every integer is either of the form  or  the former numbers are even and the latter are odd. For example, 1 is odd because  and 0 is even because  Making a table of these facts then reinforces the number line picture above.

Education
The subject of the parity of zero is often treated within the first two or three years of primary education, as the concept of even and odd numbers is introduced and developed.

Students' knowledge
The chart on the right depicts children's beliefs about the parity of zero, as they progress from Year 1 to Year 6 of the English education system. The data is from Len Frobisher, who conducted a pair of surveys of English schoolchildren. Frobisher was interested in how knowledge of single-digit parity translates to knowledge of multiple-digit parity, and zero figures prominently in the results.

In a preliminary survey of nearly 400 seven-year-olds, 45% chose even over odd when asked the parity of zero. A follow-up investigation offered more choices: neither, both, and don't know. This time the number of children in the same age range identifying zero as even dropped to 32%. Success in deciding that zero is even initially shoots up and then levels off at around 50% in Years 3 to 6. For comparison, the easiest task, identifying the parity of a single digit, levels off at about 85% success.

In interviews, Frobisher elicited the students' reasoning. One fifth-year decided that 0 was even because it was found on the 2 times table. A couple of fourth-years realized that zero can be split into equal parts. Another fourth-year reasoned "1 is odd and if I go down it's even." The interviews also revealed the misconceptions behind incorrect responses. A second-year was "quite convinced" that zero was odd, on the basis that "it is the first number you count". A fourth-year referred to 0 as "none" and thought that it was neither odd nor even, since "it's not a number". In another study, Annie Keith observed a class of 15 second-graders who convinced each other that zero was an even number based on even-odd alternation and on the possibility of splitting a group of zero things in two equal groups.

More in-depth investigations were conducted by Esther Levenson, Pessia Tsamir, and Dina Tirosh, who interviewed a pair of sixth-grade students in the USA who were performing highly in their mathematics class. One student preferred deductive explanations of mathematical claims, while the other preferred practical examples. Both students initially thought that 0 was neither even nor odd, for different reasons. Levenson et al. demonstrated how the students' reasoning reflected their concepts of zero and division.

Deborah Loewenberg Ball analyzed US third grade students' ideas about even and odd numbers and zero, which they had just been discussing with a group of fourth-graders. The students discussed the parity of zero, the rules for even numbers, and how mathematics is done. The claims about zero took many forms, as seen in the list on the right. Ball and her coauthors argued that the episode demonstrated how students can "do mathematics in school", as opposed to the usual reduction of the discipline to the mechanical solution of exercises.

One of the themes in the research literature is the tension between students' concept images of parity and their concept definitions. Levenson et al.'s sixth-graders both defined even numbers as multiples of 2 or numbers divisible by 2, but they were initially unable to apply this definition to zero, because they were unsure how to multiply or divide zero by 2. The interviewer eventually led them to conclude that zero was even; the students took different routes to this conclusion, drawing on a combination of images, definitions, practical explanations, and abstract explanations. In another study, David Dickerson and Damien Pitman examined the use of definitions by five advanced undergraduate mathematics majors. They found that the undergraduates were largely able to apply the definition of "even" to zero, but they were still not convinced by this reasoning, since it conflicted with their concept images.

Teachers' knowledge
Researchers of mathematics education at the University of Michigan have included the true-or-false prompt "0 is an even number" in a database of over 250 questions designed to measure teachers' content knowledge. For them, the question exemplifies "common knowledge ... that any well-educated adult should have", and it is "ideologically neutral" in that the answer does not vary between traditional and reform mathematics. In a 2000–2004 study of 700 primary teachers in the United States, overall performance on these questions significantly predicted improvements in students' standardized test scores after taking the teachers' classes. In a more in-depth 2008 study, the researchers found a school where all of the teachers thought that zero was neither odd nor even, including one teacher who was exemplary by all other measures. The misconception had been spread by a math coach in their building.

It is uncertain how many teachers harbor misconceptions about zero. The Michigan studies did not publish data for individual questions. Betty Lichtenberg, an associate professor of mathematics education at the University of South Florida, in a 1972 study reported that when a group of prospective elementary school teachers were given a true-or-false test including the item "Zero is an even number", they found it to be a "tricky question", with about two thirds answering "False".

Implications for instruction
Mathematically, proving that zero is even is a simple matter of applying a definition, but more explanation is needed in the context of education. One issue concerns the foundations of the proof; the definition of "even" as "integer multiple of 2" is not always appropriate. A student in the first years of primary education may not yet have learned what "integer" or "multiple" means, much less how to multiply with 0. Additionally, stating a definition of parity for all integers can seem like an arbitrary conceptual shortcut if the only even numbers investigated so far have been positive. It can help to acknowledge that as the number concept is extended from positive integers to include zero and negative integers, number properties such as parity are also extended in a nontrivial way.

Numerical cognition

Adults who do believe that zero is even can nevertheless be unfamiliar with thinking of it as even, enough so to measurably slow them down in a reaction time experiment. Stanislas Dehaene, a pioneer in the field of numerical cognition, led a series of such experiments in the early 1990s. A numeral is flashed to the subject on a monitor, and a computer records the time it takes the subject to push one of two buttons to identify the number as odd or even. The results showed that 0 was slower to process than other even numbers. Some variations of the experiment found delays as long as 60 milliseconds or about 10% of the average reaction time—a small difference but a significant one.

Dehaene's experiments were not designed specifically to investigate 0 but to compare competing models of how parity information is processed and extracted. The most specific model, the mental calculation hypothesis, suggests that reactions to 0 should be fast; 0 is a small number, and it is easy to calculate . (Subjects are known to compute and name the result of multiplication by zero faster than multiplication of nonzero numbers, although they are slower to verify proposed results like .) The results of the experiments suggested that something quite different was happening: parity information was apparently being recalled from memory along with a cluster of related properties, such as being prime or a power of two. Both the sequence of powers of two and the sequence of positive even numbers 2, 4, 6, 8, ... are well-distinguished mental categories whose members are prototypically even. Zero belongs to neither list, hence the slower responses.

Repeated experiments have shown a delay at zero for subjects with a variety of ages and national and linguistic backgrounds, confronted with number names in numeral form, spelled out, and spelled in a mirror image. Dehaene's group did find one differentiating factor: mathematical expertise. In one of their experiments, students in the École Normale Supérieure were divided into two groups: those in literary studies and those studying mathematics, physics, or biology. The slowing at 0 was "essentially found in the [literary] group", and in fact, "before the experiment, some L subjects were unsure whether 0 was odd or even and had to be reminded of the mathematical definition".

This strong dependence on familiarity again undermines the mental calculation hypothesis. The effect also suggests that it is inappropriate to include zero in experiments where even and odd numbers are compared as a group. As one study puts it, "Most researchers seem to agree that zero is not a typical even number and should not be investigated as part of the mental number line."

Everyday contexts
Some of the contexts where the parity of zero makes an appearance are purely rhetorical. The issue provides material for Internet message boards and ask-the-expert websites. Linguist Joseph Grimes muses that asking "Is zero an even number?" to married couples is a good way to get them to disagree. People who think that zero is neither even nor odd may use the parity of zero as proof that every rule has a counterexample, or as an example of a trick question.

Around the year 2000, media outlets noted a pair of unusual milestones: "1999/11/19" was the last calendar date composed of all odd digits that would occur for a very long time, and that "2000/02/02" was the first all-even date to occur in a very long time. Since these results make use of 0 being even, some readers disagreed with the idea.

In standardized tests, if a question asks about the behavior of even numbers, it might be necessary to keep in mind that zero is even. Official publications relating to the GMAT and GRE tests both state that 0 is even.

The parity of zero is relevant to odd–even rationing, in which cars may drive or purchase gasoline on alternate days, according to the parity of the last digit in their license plates. Half of the numbers in a given range end in 0, 2, 4, 6, 8 and the other half in 1, 3, 5, 7, 9, so it makes sense to include 0 with the other even numbers. However, in 1977, a Paris rationing system led to confusion: on an odd-only day, the police avoided fining drivers whose plates ended in 0, because they did not know whether 0 was even. To avoid such confusion, the relevant legislation sometimes stipulates that zero is even; such laws have been passed in New South Wales and Maryland.

On U.S. Navy vessels, even-numbered compartments are found on the port side, but zero is reserved for compartments that intersect the centerline. That is, the numbers read 6-4-2-0-1-3-5 from port to starboard. 

In the game of roulette, the number 0 does not count as even or odd, giving the casino an advantage on such bets. Similarly, the parity of zero can affect payoffs in prop bets when the outcome depends on whether some randomized number is odd or even, and it turns out to be zero.

The game of "odds and evens" is also affected: if both players cast zero fingers, the total number of fingers is zero, so the even player wins. One teachers' manual suggests playing this game as a way to introduce children to the concept that 0 is divisible by 2.

References

Bibliography

Further reading

External links 

 
  Is Zero Even? - Numberphile, video with James Grime, University of Nottingham

Elementary arithmetic
Zero
0 (number)